The following are the association football events of the year 2001 throughout the world.

Events
UEFA Champions League: Bayern Munich won 5–4 on penalties in the final against Valencia after a 1–1 draw at the end of the match. This was Bayern Munich's 4th European Cup title.
Copa Libertadores 2001: Won by Boca Juniors after defeating Cruz Azul 3–1 on a penalty shootout after a final aggregate score of 1–1.
UEFA Cup: Liverpool won 5–4 after extra-time in the final against Alavés with an unfortunate own goal/golden goal by Delfi Gelí. This was Liverpool's third UEFA Cup title.
European Super Cup: Liverpool beat Bayern Munich 3–2, winning the cup for the second time.
England – FA Cup: Liverpool won 2–1 over Arsenal
Asian Champions Cup – Korean side Suwon Samsung Bluewings won their first Asian Champions Cup crown defeating Jubilo Iwata 1–0. They also lifted the 2001 Asian Super Cup.
July 9 – Real Madrid signed playmaker Zinedine Zidane of Juventus in a world record transfer of 72 million euros.
FIFA Confederations Cup: France is the winner.
February 16 – Dutch club Sparta Rotterdam fires manager Dolf Roks, who is replaced by former international Willem van Hanegem.
April 11 – Australia broke the record for the largest win in an international match with a 31–0 win over American Samoa in the 2002 FIFA World Cup qualification match. Australian Archie Thompson also broke the record for most goals scored in an international match by scoring 13 goals in the match.
June 24 – The Czech Republic's Moravia wins the second UEFA Regions' Cup, beating Portugal's Braga 4–2 on penalties, after drawing 2–2 after extra time, in Zlín.
September 19 – Manager Jan van Dijk is fired by Dutch club Roda JC and replaced by Belgium's Georges Leekens.
November 27 – Bayern Munich wins the Intercontinental Cup in Tokyo, Japan for the second time, by defeating titleholder Boca Juniors from Argentina: 1–0. The only goal for the Germans is scored by Ghanaian defender Sammy Kuffour.
December 3 – Manager Ronald Koeman switches from Dutch club Vitesse Arnhem to Ajax. He is replaced by former player Edward Sturing.
December 14 – Willem II fires manager Hans Verèl.

Winners national club championship

Asia
 Iran
Azadegan League – Esteghal
2nd Division – Aboomoslem
Hazfi Cup – Fajr Sepasi
 Japan – Kashima Antlers
 Qatar – Al-Wakrah
 Singapore – Geylang United
 South Korea – Seongnam Ilhwa Chunma

Europe
  – Hajduk Split
 England – Manchester United
 France – Nantes
 Germany – Bayern Munich
  – Roma
 
 Eredivisie – PSV
 Eerste Divisie – Den Bosch
  – Boavista
  – Real Madrid
  – Fenerbahçe
 FR Yugoslavia – Red Star Belgrade

North America
 – St. Catharines Wolves (CPSL)

Verano – Santos
Invierno – Pachuca
 – San Jose Earthquakes (MLS)

South America

Clausura – San Lorenzo
Apertura – Racing Club
 – Oriente Petrolero
 – Atlético Paranaense
 – Emelec
 Paraguay – Cerro Porteño
 -Club Alianza Lima

International tournaments
 UNCAF Nations Cup in Honduras (May 23 – June 3, 2001)
 
 
 
 Baltic Cup in Riga, Latvia (July 3 – 5 2001)
 
 
 
 Copa América in Colombia (July 11–29, 2001)
 
 
 
 FIFA U-20 World Cup in Argentina (June 17 – July 8, 2001)
 
 
 
 FIFA U-17 World Championship in Trinidad and Tobago (September 13–30, 2001)

National team results

Europe



South America



Movies
Shaolin Soccer (Hong Kong)

Births
 4 January – Odilon Kossounou, Ivorian footballer
 5 January – Mykhailo Mudryk, Ukrainian footballer
 9 January 
 Eric García, Spanish international
 Rodrygo Goes, Brazilian international
 14 January – Myron Boadu, Dutch international
 16 January – Agustín Sández, Argentine club footballer
 17 January – Enzo Fernández, Argentine international
 11 February – Bryan Gil, Spanish international
 12 February – Khvicha Kvaratskhelia, Georgian international
 19 February – Lee Kang-in, South Korean international
 17 March – Pietro Pellegri, Italian under-19 international 
 9 April – Sinaly Diomandé, Ivorian footballer
 18 April – Santiago Giménez, Mexican international
 19 April – Micky van de Ven, Dutch youth international
 8 May – Jordyn Huitema, Canadian women's international
 9 May – Matko Miljevic, US youth international	
 30 May – Patrick Wimmer, Austrian international
 17 June – Jurriën Timber, Dutch international
 18 June – Gabriel Martinelli, Brazilian international
 20 June – Gonçalo Ramos, Portuguese footballer
 29 June – Allahyar Sayyadmanesh, Iranian footballer
 5 August – Ethan Laird, English youth international
 20 September – Johnny Cardoso, US international
 1 October – Mason Greenwood, English under-21 international
 3 October – Liel Abada, Israeli international
 8 October – Witan Sulaeman, Indonesian footballer
 29 October – Beckham Putra, Indonesian youth international
 2 November – Moisés Caicedo, Ecuadorian footballer
 30 November – Jordan Carrillo, Mexican footballer
 17 December – Abde Ezzalzouli, Moroccan footballer
 20 December – Facundo Pellistri, Uruguayan footballer

Deaths

February
 February 14 – Domènec Balmanya (86), Spanish footballer and manager

April
 April 5 – Aldo Olivieri, Italian goalkeeper, winner of the 1938 FIFA World Cup. (90)

May
 May 8 – Luis Rijo, Uruguayan striker, winner of the 1950 FIFA World Cup. (73)
 May 12 – Didì, Brazilian forward, winner of the 1958 FIFA World Cup and 1962 FIFA World Cup . (72)
 May 31 – Otto Hemele (75), Czech footballer

July
 July 17 - Wilhelm Simetsreiter (86), German footballer

August
 August 3 – Mario Perazzolo, Italian defender, winner of the 1938 FIFA World Cup. (90)

November
 November 1 – Serge Mésones (53), French footballer

December
 December 12 – Josef Bican (88), Austrian and Czechoslovak footballer and manager

References

 
Association football by year